Tomáš Kundrátek (born December 26, 1989) is a Czech professional ice hockey defenseman currently playing with HC Oceláři Třinec in the Czech Extraliga (ELH). He has previously played in the National Hockey League for the Washington Capitals.

Playing career
Whilst playing as a youth and professionally with HC Oceláři Třinec in his native Czech Republic, He was selected 90th overall by the New York Rangers in the 2008 NHL Entry Draft, where he was the top-ranked Czech skater. Kundratek signed his first professional contract with the New York Rangers on August 25, 2008. The following season, intending to adapt to the North American style, Kundrátek joined the Medicine Hat Tigers of the Canadian Major Junior Western Hockey League.

He skated in 70 games as a rookie for the Rangers AHL affiliate, the Connecticut Whale, during the 2010–11 season, registering two goals and ten assists for 12 points, along with 42 penalty minutes and an even plus/minus rating. He also skated in all six of the Whale's playoff games versus the Portland Pirates in the first round of the Calder Cup playoffs, earning two assists and two penalty minutes.   He was traded by the Rangers to the Washington Capitals in exchange for Francois Bouchard on November 8, 2011.

During the 2011–12 season, Kundratek was recalled from AHL affiliate, the Hershey Bears, to Washington on January 10, 2012, and made his NHL debut the following night in a 1-0 win over the Pittsburgh Penguins. He played for five games before returning to Hershey to continue playing with the Bears on January 20, 2012. He didn't record any points while playing with the Capitals, but he did have two shots on goal, three hits, four blocked shots and 2 PIM.

In the lockout shortened 2012–13 season, having secured an opening night roster spot with the Capitals, he then scored his first NHL goal against the Boston Bruins on March 5, 2013.

On June 19, 2015, Kundratek left the Capitals organization and signed a one-year contract with Latvian Kontinental Hockey League club, Dinamo Riga.

Personal life 
In 2014, Kundrátek married Alannah Dzerdz from Medicine Hat, Alberta. They have two sons together, Hudson and Jagger.

Career statistics

Regular season and playoffs

International

References

External links
 

1989 births
Connecticut Whale (AHL) players
Czech ice hockey defencemen
HC Davos players
Dinamo Riga players
HC Kunlun Red Star players
HC Oceláři Třinec players
HC Slovan Bratislava players
Hartford Wolf Pack players
Hershey Bears players
Ice hockey players at the 2018 Winter Olympics
Ice hockey players at the 2022 Winter Olympics
Living people
Medicine Hat Tigers players
New York Rangers draft picks
Olympic ice hockey players of the Czech Republic
Sportspeople from Přerov
Torpedo Nizhny Novgorod players
Washington Capitals players
Czech expatriate ice hockey players in the United States
Czech expatriate ice hockey players in Canada
Czech expatriate ice hockey players in Slovakia
Czech expatriate ice hockey players in Russia
Expatriate ice hockey players in China
Expatriate ice hockey players in Latvia
Czech expatriate ice hockey players in Switzerland
Czech expatriate sportspeople in Latvia
Czech expatriate sportspeople in China